James Kenneth MacLeod (18 August 1890 – 8 April 1940) was an Australian rules footballer who played with University in the Victorian Football League (VFL).

Family
The son of James MacLeod (1859-1938), and Hughina Walker MacLeod (1860-1920), née McCallum, James Kenneth MacLeod was born at Warrnambool, Victoria on 18 August 1890.

He married Freda May Potter in 1922.

Education
MacLeod was educated at the Hawthorn College, and at the University of Melbourne.

B.Mech.E.
While studying mechanical engineering at the University of Melbourne, he gained a "blue" in football.

His degree, Bachelor of Mechanical Engineering (B.Mech.E.) was conferred upon him, in absentia, on 23 December 1919.

Football
He played 54 games and scored 33 goals over four seasons (1910 to 1913) with Melbourne University Football Club in the VFL.
"A rover, McLeod (sic) was regarded as a tremendous goal-sneak and undoubtedly was one of the Students' most accomplished players.

Military service
He served in the Australian Navy in World War I, and later moved to England.

In World War II he worked for the British war office, before he got a commission in the Royal Navy.

Death
He was killed in [[HMS Glowworm (H92)#Final battle|the sinking of HMS Glowworm (H92)]] in the Norwegian Sea on 8 April 1940.

Although initially "presumed killed in action", a note on his service record (dated 1 May 1940) reports: "Not included in published list of "Glowworm" casualties Admiralty having unconfirmed report that he may be prisoner of war." A further note (dated 6 October 1942) reports: "Death on April 8th 1940 now presumed."

He has no known grave. He is commemorated at the Plymouth Naval Memorial.

See also
 List of Victorian Football League players who died in active service

Footnotes

References
 
 Main, J. & Allen, D., "McLeod (sic), Ken", pp. 294–295 in Main, J. & Allen, D., Fallen – The Ultimate Heroes: Footballers Who Never Returned From War, Crown Content, (Melbourne), 2002. 
 Service Record: James Kenneth MacLeod (d.o.b. 18 August 1890), National Archives of Australia.
 Roll of Honour: Engineering Lieutenant Commander James Kenneth Macleod, Australian War Memorial.

External links

 
 
 Ken MacLeod, at Boyles Football Photos''.

1890 births
Royal Navy officers
Australian rules footballers from Victoria (Australia)
University Football Club players
Royal Navy personnel killed in World War II
Royal Australian Navy personnel
People lost at sea
1940 deaths
Australian emigrants to England
Australian military personnel of World War I
Royal Navy officers of World War II
Military personnel from Victoria (Australia)
War Office personnel in World War II
People from Warrnambool
University of Melbourne alumni sportspeople